USS Flamingo (MSC(O)-11/AMS-11/YMS-238) was a  built for the United States Navy during World War II. She was the third U.S. Navy ship to be named for the flamingo.

History
Flamingo was laid down as YMS-238 on 11 May 1942 by Stadium Yacht Basin, Inc. of Cleveland, Ohio; launched, 12 September 1942; completed and commissioned on 23 November 1942.

On 10 November 1944, YMS-238 was damaged when ammunition ship  exploded in Seeadler Harbor at Manus Island.

YMS-238 was renamed and reclassified as USS Flamingo (AMS-11) on 18 February 1947. She was further reclassified as MSC(O)-11 on 7 February 1955.

Flamingo was struck from the Naval Vessel Register on 1 November 1959. Her fate is unknown.

References

External links 
 

YMS-1-class minesweepers of the United States Navy
Ships built in Cleveland
1942 ships
World War II minesweepers of the United States
Maritime incidents in November 1944